This is the list of cathedrals in Morocco sorted by denomination.

Roman Catholic 
Cathedrals of the Roman Catholic Church in Morocco:
St. Peter's Cathedral, Rabat
Roman Catholic Cathedral of Tangier
The former Casablanca Cathedral

See also
List of cathedrals
Christianity in Morocco

References

 
Morocco
Cathedrals
Cathedrals